The 1913–14 season was the 41st season of competitive football in Scotland and the 24th season of the Scottish Football League. 1913–14 saw an increase from 18 teams to 20 teams in Division one while the number of teams in Division two was decreased back to 12 from 14.

Scottish League Division One

Champions: Celtic

Scottish League Division Two

Scottish Cup

Division One champions Celtic were winners of the Scottish Cup after a 4–1 replay win over Hibernian.

Other Honours

National

County

. *replay

Highland League

Junior Cup

Larkhall Thistle were winners of the Junior Cup after a 1–0 win over Ashfield in the replayed final, after two drawn matches.

Scotland national team

Key:
 (H) = Home match
 (A) = Away match
 BHC = British Home Championship

See also
1913–14 Aberdeen F.C. season

Notes and references

External links
Scottish Football Historical Archive

 
Seasons in Scottish football